Iman Heydari (born January 21, 1983) is an Iranian footballer who played for Paykan in the Azadegan League.

Club career
Heydari joined Rah Ahan F.C. in 2009

Club career statistics

 Assist Goals

Honours

Club
Hazfi Cup
Runner up:1
2011–12 with Shahin Bushehr

References

1983 births
Living people
Rah Ahan players
Paykan F.C. players
Zob Ahan Esfahan F.C. players
Persian Gulf Pro League players
Azadegan League players
Iranian footballers
Association football forwards